Laughing Boy with a Flute is an oil-on-canvas painting by the Dutch Golden Age painter Frans Hals, painted in the early 1620s.

Painting 
This painting was documented by Hofstede de Groot in 1910, who wrote "31. A LAUGHING BOY WITH A FLUTE. M. 240. Half-length, in profile to the left. The head is three-quarters left. The long hair falls in disorder. The lips are parted, showing the teeth. On the left the flute is held upright in the right hand. The eyes look to the 
left and slightly upward. Lifelike colour in the face. Circular panel, n| inches across the grain of the wood running diagonally. A copy is in the Boucher de Perthes Museum, Abbeville. In the collection of the late Alfred Beit, London. In the collection of Otto Beit, London."

Hofstede de Groot noted several laughing boys by Hals along with this one (catalogue numbers 11 through to 39). This painting was also documented by W.R. Valentiner in 1923.

Other boys painted by Hals in round tondos:

References

1625 paintings
Paintings by Frans Hals
Paintings of children
Musical instruments in art